Geraldine "Hazel" Daly (October 8, 1895 – January 2, 1987) was an American film actress. 

Daly was born on October 8, 1895, in Chicago, Illinois, U.S. and died on January 2, 1987, in Santa Monica, California, at the age of 91. She appeared in 18 films. 

She married Harry Beaumont and had twin daughters Anne and Geraldine, born in 1922.

Filmography
Boys Will Be Boys (1915)
The Tenderfoot's Triumph (1915) – Hazel – the Ranchman's Daughter
The Impersonation of Tom (1915) – Hazel
Shooting Up the Movies (1916) – Hazel
Skinner's Dress Suit (1917) – Honey
A Four Cent Courtship (1917) – Miriam York
Satan's Private Door (1917) – Anne Vance
Skinner's Bubble (1917) – Honey
Filling His Own Shoes (1917) – Ruth Downing
Mr. Pringle and Success (1917) – Doris Pringle
A Corner in Smiths (1917) – Isobel Smith
Skinner's Baby (1917) – Honey
Brown of Harvard (1918) – Evelyn Ames
A Wild Goose Chase (1919) – Margaret Sherwood
The Little Rowdy (1919) - Betty Hall, the little rowdy
The Gay Lord Quex (1919) – Sophie Fullgarney
Stop Thief! (1920) – Snatcher Nell
Beating the Game (1921) – Nellie Brown

References

External links
 
 

1895 births
1987 deaths
Actresses from Chicago
20th-century American actresses
American film actresses